The SH-01 Gaia, is a sixty four voice polyphonic virtual analogue synthesizer introduced by Roland Corporation in 2010.

Architecture
The SH-01 Gaia is a follow up to the popular SH-201. The lightweight unit is designed with a simple layout and no menu so you can adjust the sounds parameters in real time. It has a USB interface so it can be easily connected up to a computer for sequencing.

D-Beam
D Beam controller for sound manipulation. There is also a Phrase Recorder on board. The D-Beam can be controlled in real time by placing your hand over a sensor on the keyboard to control, and affects the pitch volume and can also be assigned to control another parameter for each patch.

Effects
Effects are stackable and can be combined for up to five effects to be used at the same time.

Power
The unit runs on AC power or batteries for portable use.

References

SH-01 Gaia
Virtual analog synthesizers
D-Beam
Polyphonic synthesizers